Emil Martinov (born 18 March 1992) is a Bulgarian footballer who plays as a midfielder for Sabail.

Club career
On 11 August 2018, Martinov signed contract with Azerbaijan Premier League side Sabail FK. In September 2021 he joined CSKA 1948.

Honours
Slavia Sofia
 Bulgarian Cup (1): 2017–18

References

External links
 
 Martinov Statistics in Germany

1992 births
Living people
Bulgarian footballers
Association football defenders
First Professional Football League (Bulgaria) players
Second Professional Football League (Bulgaria) players
Azerbaijan Premier League players
PFC Slavia Sofia players
PFC Svetkavitsa players
OFC Sliven 2000 players
PFC Spartak Varna players
BC Aichach players
Sabail FK players
FC Arda Kardzhali players
Expatriate footballers in Azerbaijan
Bulgarian expatriate sportspeople in Azerbaijan